Sainte-Cécile-les-Vignes (Provençal: Santa Celha dei Vinhas) is a commune in the Vaucluse department in the Provence-Alpes-Côte d'Azur region in southeastern France.

Nearby cities are Orange and the smaller Bollène. It is also not far from the Mont Ventoux.

Maurice Trintignant, a motor racing driver and vintner, was born here on 30 October 1917.

Twin towns
  Auzances, Limousin

See also
Communes of the Vaucluse department
 Félix Charpentier Sculptor of Sainte-Cécile-les-Vignes War Memorial

References

Communes of Vaucluse